Nikitas is a village in Cyprus, 4 km southwest of Morphou. De facto, it is under the control of the Turkish Republic of Northern Cyprus.

References

Communities in Nicosia District
Populated places in Güzelyurt District
Greek Cypriot villages depopulated during the 1974 Turkish invasion of Cyprus